Monroe Point is an ice-free tipped point projecting 1.1 km into Boyd Strait from the west coast of Snow Island in the South Shetland Islands, Antarctica, and forming the south side of the entrance to Barutin Cove.

The feature's name derives from the name 'Monroe Island' applied to Snow Island by 19th century sealers.

Location

Map
 L.L. Ivanov. Antarctica: Livingston Island and Greenwich, Robert, Snow and Smith Islands. Scale 1:120000 topographic map.  Troyan: Manfred Wörner Foundation, 2009.

References
 SCAR Composite Antarctic Gazetteer.

Headlands of the South Shetland Islands